Fasahale (Somali: Fasahaale Arabic:فصحالي) more commonly known as Kafaari are a Benadiri/12 Koofi clan mainly from the southern coastal city of Marka.

Overview 
The Kafaari have specialised in the manufacture of iron and have their huts-workshops to the east of the city, near the fish market. The young people of the clan prefer to become drivers or mechanics, only a few elderly people continue the art of blacksmiths.  According to Pantano (1910: 15) The Kafaari are a fraction of the Sa'ad (Biimaal) and have been in Marka for 250 years

References 

Somali clans